The 40–step stairway is a historic stairway in the Jung District of Busan, South Korea. It sits at one end of the 40-step Culture & Tourism Theme Street, which is a tourist attraction intended to recall the history of the area and in particular its importance to refugees during and after the Korean War.  The staircase itself was known as a common location for refugees to seek reunification with their families and friends, given the lack of functional communications during the War.  The 40–step stairway appears in the film Nowhere to Hide.

References

External links

Buildings and structures in Busan
Tourist attractions in Busan
Stairways
Jung District, Busan